Pavement engineering is a branch of civil engineering that uses engineering techniques to design and maintain flexible (asphalt) and rigid (concrete) pavements. This includes streets and highways and involves knowledge of soils, hydraulics, and material properties. Pavement engineering involves new construction as well as rehabilitation and maintenance of existing pavements. Maintenance often involves using engineering judgment to make maintenance repairs with the highest long-term benefit and lowest cost. The Pavement Condition Index (PCI) is an example of an engineering approach applied to existing pavements.  Another example is the use of a falling weight deflectometer (FWD) to non-destructively test existing pavements. Calculation of pavement layer strengths can be performed from the resulting deflection data. The two methods - empirical or mechanistic is used to determine pavement layer thicknesses.

The evaluation of existing road pavements is done based on 3 factors: 

 Functional surface condition, where all the distresses such as cracks, potholes, rutting and others are analyzed. 
 Structural condition, which analyzes pavement's structural strength to take loading from trucks.
 Roughness, using parameters such as the International Roughness Index to evaluate comfort for drivers.

See also
NCAT Pavement Test Track

References

External links
 Pavement engineering

 
Transportation engineering